The Strange Case of Dr. Jekyll and Mr. Hyde is a 1968 Canadian-American TV film based on the 1886 novella Strange Case of Dr Jekyll and Mr Hyde by Robert Louis Stevenson. It was directed by Charles Jarrott, produced by Dan Curtis, and written by Ian McLellan Hunter.

It was one of a series of adaptations of famous novels done by ABC.

Cast
Jack Palance as Dr. Henry Jekyll / Mr. Edward Hyde
Denholm Elliott as Mr. George Devlin
Leo Genn as Dr. Lanyon
Torin Thatcher as Sir John Turnbull
Rex Sevenoaks as Dr. Wright
Gillie Fenwick as Poole
Elizabeth Cole as Hattie
Duncan Lamont as Sergeant Grimes
Paul Harding as Constable Johnson
Oskar Homolka as Stryker
Billie Whitelaw as Gwyn Thomas
Tessie O'Shea as Tessie O'Toole
Donald Webster as Garvis

Production
Dan Curtis decided to make a film of Jekyll and Hyde. Rod Serling wrote a draft of the script, and Jason Robards was to star, with filming to take place in London. Robards was unhappy with the script. Filming in London proved difficult due to a technician's union strike. Filming was pushed back, and Robards decided to drop out, unhappy with the script.

Curtis decided to get a new script and find a new star. Ian McLellan Hunter wrote a new script. Curtis had discussed doing another project with Jack Palance, who agreed to take over the lead role. The producer decided to film in Canada, where it would be cheaper than the U.S.

Filming took place in Toronto over seven weeks in 1967. Curtis had to pay $200,000 to build a replicant Washington Square in Toronto. Palance was injured while filming a stunt. The budget was approximately $900,000. ABC paid for approximately half of this.

The show was nominated for four Emmy awards - Outstanding Dramatic Program, Outstanding Performance by an Actress in a Supporting Role in a Drama, Best Graphic Design, and Best Make-up.

References

External links
The Strange Case of Dr Jekyll and Mr Hyde at IMDb

1968 horror films
1968 films
English-language Canadian films
American horror television films
Canadian horror television films
Dr. Jekyll and Mr. Hyde films
Films shot in Toronto
Films directed by Charles Jarrott
1960s American films
1960s Canadian films